The ninth series of The Bill, a British television drama, consisted of 155 episodes, broadcast between 5 January – 31 December 1993. The series was released on DVD for the first time on 3 October 2012, in Australia. As of the year's first episode, the series increased its weekly output to three 30-minute episodes, having been twice-weekly half-hour episodes since 1988. The series saw a number of high-profile exits, including a shooting murder for WDC Viv Martella, the dismissal of DS Ted Roach for assaulting Inspector Andrew Monroe and the mysterious at the time exit of DI Frank Burnside, whose exit reason would not be revealed until he returned in 1998. Characters from previous years joined the series including DS Danny Pearce, who appeared as a DC from another station the previous year. In addition, Chief Inspector Philip Cato and DI Harry Haines joined with new names after past guest stints; Haines, like Pearce, appeared the year before but was named DS Ken Haines, while Cato had appeared in 1990 as Inspector Twist at Barton Street, the man who ended the career of Sergeant Tom Penny. Cato was given Twist's backstory despite the name change, leading to animosity from the Sun Hill officers in several of his scenes.

Audio Commentaries have been released for the episodes "No Thanks To You" (with writer Candy Denman and director Jan Sargent), "Blind Spot" (with writer Roger Davenport), "On The Loose" (with writer Candy Denman and director Laurence Moody) and "Compliments of the Service" with actor Mike Burnside (D.A.C. Trevor Hicks).

Cast changes

Arrivals
 Ch. Insp. Philip Cato (Episode 4-)
 Sgt Jane Kendall (Episode 11-Episode 112)
 PC Mike Jarvis (Episode 13-)
 WPC Suzi Croft (Episode 17-)
 WDC Jo Morgan (Episode 28-) (Promoted to WDS in Episode 78)
 DS Danny Pearce (Episode 60-)
 Sgt Ray Steele (Episode 85-)
 DI Harry Haines (Episode 108-)

Departures
 WDC Viv Martella – Shot dead on duty
 PC Ron Smollett - Unexplained
 DS Ted Roach – Resigned after assaulting Inspector Andrew Monroe
 PC Barry Stringer - Transferred after resigning as Fed Rep
 Sgt John Maitland - Transferred to Hendon
 DI Frank Burnside - Joined the National Crime Squad for undercover work (returned in 1998)
 Sgt Jane Kendall - Unexplained
 DI Harry Haines - Transferred back to the Drugs Squad

Episodes

References

1993 British television seasons
The Bill series